Notable events of 2018 in webcomics.

Events

Awards
 Eisner Awards, "Best Webcomic" won by Katie O’Neill's The Tea Dragon Society.
 Ignatz Awards, "Outstanding Online Comic" won by Carta Monir's Lara Croft Was My Family.
 Joe Shuster Awards, "Outstanding Webcomic Creator" won by Gisele Lagace (Ménage à 3).
 Harvey Awards, "Digital Book of the Year" won by Brian K. Vaughan, Marcos Martín, and Muntsa Vicente's Barrier.
 Reuben Awards, "Online Comics"; Short Form won by Gemma Correll's Gemma Correll, Long Form won by John Allison's Bad Machinery.
 Ringo Awards:
 "Favorite Publisher" won by WEBTOON.
 "Best Webcomic" won by Sanford Greene's 1000.
 Cartoonist Studio Prize, "Best Web Comic" won by Michael DeForge's Leaving Richard's Valley.
 Aurora Awards, "Best Graphic Novel" won by Peter Chiykowski's Rock, Paper, Cynic.

Webcomics started

 March 4 — Lore Olympus by Rachel Smythe
 March 4 — Solo Leveling by Chugong
 March 10 — Strangers from Hell by Kim Yong-ki
 March 20 — Refund High School by Croissant and Studio LICO
 April 2 — True Beauty by Yaongyi
 April 30 — Devil Number 4 by Jang-jin and Woombeee
 July 11 — Mayoking by Brian King
 Aug 11 — Oct 13 — Your Letter by Hyun-ah Cho
 Aug 20 — Mage & Demon Queen by Kuru
 September 21 — Four Leaf by Lumaga
 October 2 — Eleceed by Son Je-ho and Zhena
 October 21 — SubZero by Junepurrr
 Acursian by John Barrowman
 Backchannel by Stan Lee and Tom Akel
 Caster by Common and Noble Transmission

Webcomics ended
 Guilded Age by T Campbell, Phil Kahn, Erica Henderson, & the Waltrip brothers, 2009 – 2018
 Oh! Holy by Ahyun, 2015 – 2018
 Spirit Fingers by Han Kyoung-chal, 2015 – 2018
 Super Secret by eon, 2015 – 2018
 Hello World! by Alex Norris, 2016 – 2018
 Nano List by Min Song-ah, 2016 – 2018
 Leaving Richard's Valley by Michael DeForge, 2017 – 2018
 War Cry by Dean Haspiel, 2017 – 2018
 Woman World by Aminder Dhaliwal, 2017 – 2018
 1000 by Chuck Brown and Sanford Greene, 2017 – 2018

References

 
Webcomics by year